Lake Petersburg is a census-designated place in Menard County, Illinois, United States. Its population was 740 as of the 2020 census. The unincorporated community centers on a small reservoir, which is used extensively by residents for recreation.

Geography
Lake Petersburg is southwest of the center of Menard County, surrounding a reservoir of the same name, built in a valley that flows to the Sangamon River less than a mile to the east.

Demographics

References

External links
Community website

Census-designated places in Menard County, Illinois
Census-designated places in Illinois